Dalkhola is a city and a municipality of Uttar Dinajpur district in the state of West Bengal, India.

History
Dalkhola was originally in the state of Bihar in India. After 1959, Dalkhola was located in the state of West Bengal. The town expanded around the Dalkhola village Panchayats and developed into an important centre for trade and commerce due to mainstream connection with both Railway and Roadway. It is an important center for commodities like jute, corn and oil trade in Uttar Dinajpur. It is also an important center for the trade of maize, which is produced in the neighboring state of Bihar.

Before, and for some time after, the independence of India in 1947, Dalkhola was a sleepy, rural area where some Pucca and Kaccha roads were connected. The area was mostly covered by jungle, and only some parts of the town were suitable for living. The residents' main source of income was agriculture and fishery in the Mahananda River. It was ruled by Raja P. C. Lal. After the partition of India, numerous refugees came to Dalkhola from Bangladesh (formerly known as East Pakistan) and started living in surrounding rural areas. In 1956 the area was transferred to the territory of West Bengal by the tireless efforts of the then Chief Minister Dr. B. C. Roy. It is an important place in this region, as NH 12 and NH 27 intersect at this place. Small villages are administered by the Panchayat Ministry, and they have gradually developed into busy market zones, which gradually converted into small townships. With the growth of population and economic activities, the people of Dalkhola experienced a massive change – in terms of both socio-economic development and quality of life. As a consequence, Dalkhola Municipality was set up on 1 January 2003 to foster social and economic development.

Politics
Dalkhola became a municipality in 2003. In the Dalkhola municipal area, there were 14 Wards. But now 2 more ward are divided now there are 16 wards. In last election, the Indian National Congress won 9 seats out of 14, and the Communist Party of India (Marxist) won the other 5 seats. It is one of the four municipalities in North Dinajpur district.
Dalkhola has 16 now. in 
Recently 2013 Municipality election Congress won 10 seats,  cpim 4 and Tmc 2.
Now whole councillors of congress party joined Trinamool Congress nd now the status are TMC 12, CPIM 4 and CONG 0,

On general civic body election 2022 Dalkhola's figures are 12 Trinamool Congress, 4 Independent

Geography

In the map alongside, all places marked on the map are linked in the full screen version.

It is the second-largest area in the Uttar Dinajpur district, with a length 13 km from East to West, 18 km from North to South. Dalkhola was divided on the 14 wards. But now to more wards are added, 9 number ward divided into 9 and 16 and 11 number ward divided into 11 and 15.

The following 16 ward are:

 Muhammad Pur
 Hari Pur
 Bhusamani
 Mithapur
 Malickpur More
 Deshbandhu Para
 Dalkhola Bazar
 High School Para
 Dalkhola Basti
 Subhash Pally
 Farsara
 Bidhan Pally
 Uttar Dalkhola
 Purnia More
 Shikar Pur
 Nichit Pur
 Binoy colony
 Shree pally
 Vivekananda pally
 Hatbari
 College para
 College more
 High school more

Climate
The cooler months in Dalkhola begin in December and end in February. The temperature generally peaks at about 35 °C. The annual low temperature is usually near 10 °C. The monsoon season starts in June and runs through September.

Development

Dalkhola is the largest exporter of Maize in West Bengal.
In Dalkhola, a national level Power Grid was established in 1973, which expanded the availability of electricity to the Municipality and nearby areas of Dalkhola . Other developments include a Flour Mill, Tantia agro chemical Pvt Ltd  and maize processing company which use the crops produced by local farmers.

Official languages
As per the West Bengal Official Language (Amendment) Act, 2012, which came into force from December 2012, Urdu was given the status of official language in areas, such as subdivisions and blocks, having more than 10% Urdu speaking population. In Uttar Dinajpur district, Goalpokhar I and II blocks, Islampur block and Islampur municipality were identified as fulfilling the norms set In 2014, Calcutta High Court, in an order, included Dalkhola municipality in the list.

Schools
The schools in Dalkhola include:

Dalkhola High School (H.S)
Dalkhola Girls High School (H.S)
Uttar Dalkhola High School (H.S)
Hindi High School (H.S)
Middle School
Farsara F.P School
Nazarpur F.P School
Jawahar Navadoya Vidyalaya, Dalkhola
Dalkhola Urdu Jr High School
Itvata F.P. School
Sarsar F.F. School
Nichitpur F. P. School
Subhash Pally F.P. School

English medium schools
St. Mary's School (Dalkhola)
St. Stephen's School
St. Xavier's School (Dalkhola)
Dalkhola Public School (D.P.S)
Iqra Public School
Children's Academy
South Point Public school (Loknathpara)
Holy Cross School
National Public School (High School Para)
St Ignatius School

College

Shree Agrasen Mahavidyalaya was established in 1995. Affiliated to the University of Gour Banga it offers honours courses in Bengali, Hindi, English, history, political science, sociology and accountancy, and general courses in arts and commerce. Urdu is taught as a general subject.

Demographics

As per the 2011 Census of India, Dalkhola had a total population of 36,930, of which 19,230 (52%) were males and 17,700 (48%) were females. Population below 6 years was 5,592. The total number of literates in Dalkhola was 21,207 (67.67% of the population over 6 years).

In the 2001 India census, Dalkhola had a population of 13,891. In 2008, the population grew to approximately 19,000. Males constituted 54% of the population and females 46%. The literacy rate in Dalkhola of 69% was greater than the national average of 59.5%; male literacy was 70% and female literacy was 63%. In Dalkhola, 18% of the population was under 6 years of age.

Decadal growth for the period 1991 to 2001 was 30.41% in Dalkhola, compared to 28.72% in the Uttar Dinajpur district. Decadal growth in West Bengal was 17.84%.

Year of Establishment Dalkhola Municipality has been formed on 01 /01 /2003 as per Notification No. 1 /MA/0 /C-4 /1 M-14 / 2000 with the entire area of Dalkhola 1 and four mouza of Dalkhola 2 gram panchayats with a population of 29783 according to the census of 2001. Dalkhola Municipality is the 4 th Municipality of Uttar Dinajpur district constituted with 14 wards and first election was held on 22 /06 /2003 and second election was held on 29 /06 /2008. Sri Himadri Mukharjee was the first chairman and Sri Subhas Goshwami has become the Chairman in the second. Sri Tanay Day was the 3 rd Chairman. Swadesh sarkar is on chair.

Transport

Highway 34 cuts through the middle of the town to meet NH 31. NH 34 starts from Dalkhola and it ends in Dumdum, near Kolkata to help northeastern part of India to connect kolkata.

There are two airports near Dalkhola. Bagdogra Airport is 100 km away, and Purnea Airport is 40 km from Dalkhola.
The largest railway station and busiest Rack point in the district is located in Dalkhola. This railway connects to several major cities, including Siliguri, Kolkata, Guwahati, Delhi, Jaipur, Chennai and Patna. Bus transportation runs from Dalkhola to Siliguri, Raiganj, Kishanganj, Kaliaganj, Balurghat, and Malda.
AC bus services for Kolkata, Bhutan, Patna and Siliguri are also available from Dalkhola.

Festivals
Many religious festivals are observed in Dalkhola. The three largest festivals are Durga puja, Eid, and Diwali. Other festivals include Holi, Kurbani, Chhat Puja, Muharram, Saraswati Puja, Kali Puja, Dushera, Christmas, and Bishwakarama Puja.
Muslims religious festival are observed in Dalkhola. The three largest festival are [Eid ultimate zuha] Eid ul fitr & Moharram.

Media
Dalkhola press club is under on North Bengal Press club.
Dalkhola News is social news portal for local news

References

External links

news and many more by Akhtar ahmed
other details of Dalkhola
PHOTOS or IMAGES of DALKHOLA

Cities and towns in Uttar Dinajpur district
Cities in West Bengal